The Wanderer (in the USA) or The Sultan's Renegade (in the UK) is a 1949 historical novel by Mika Waltari. It is a sequel to The Adventurer, which tells of the adventures of a young Finnish man, Mikael Karvajalka, in 16th-century Europe. The Wanderer tells the story of how Mikael converts from Christianity to Islam and rises to a high position in the court of Suleiman the Magnificent. Many historical events are recounted in the book, but Mikael's involvement in them is fictitious.

Plot

Reception
The Mikael duology won the 1950 State Literary Prize of Finland.

Notes

1949 Finnish novels
20th-century Finnish novels
G. P. Putnam's Sons books
Historical novels
Novels by Mika Waltari
Novels set in the 16th century
Novels set in the Ottoman Empire
Picaresque novels